Puerto Rico Highway 22 (PR-22), also part of unsigned Interstate PR2, is an  long toll road in the north coast of Puerto Rico that connects the cities of San Juan and Hatillo. The road is also known as the José de Diego Expressway (Spanish: Expreso José de Diego), and is part of unsigned Interstate PR-2.  It is a 4-lane road for much of its length, but expands to up to 12 lanes in the San Juan metro area.  The road is frequently congested, in particular during rush hour due to heavy commuter traffic.

Route description

PR-22 is Puerto Rico's most traveled highway.
PR-22 runs parallel to PR-2 and is concurrent with unsigned Interstate Highway PRI-2. Unlike PR-22, PR-2 is not a controlled-access road, and has numerous traffic signals throughout the full run of its course. The construction of highway PR-22 reduced congestion on PR-2. The eastern terminus is at PR-26 (a non-tolled freeway) in Santurce, and passes through the Minillas Tunnel before its terminus at PR-26. The freeway bypasses all of the cities PR-2 passes through (see below under "Course of the Expressway"). PR-22's western terminus is at PR-2 in Hatillo.  From there, PR-2 continues to Aguadilla and Mayagüez, ending in Ponce.

Municipalities served
The following is the list of municipalities/towns which PR-22 cuts through, in order from San Juan to Hatillo (westbound):

 San Juan
 Guaynabo
 Cataño
 Bayamón
 Toa Baja
 Dorado
 Vega Alta
 Vega Baja
 Manatí
 Barceloneta
 Arecibo
 Hatillo

History
Construction of this road began in 1969. The section from San Juan to Toa Baja opened in 1969 and in 1997 to Arecibo. 
Construction of the road was partially funded from appropriations of the U.S. Interstate Highway System.

Privatization
The Autopistas Metropolitanas de Puerto Rico (Metropistas) consortium, comprised by Abertis Infraestructuras and Goldman Sachs Infrastructure Partners II LP, placed the winning bid for the 40-year PR-22 and PR-5 highway concession. The highways generate between $90 million and $95 million annually in toll revenue, which will now go to the private operators.

Future

PR-22 is planned to be extended to Aguadilla.  The extension will be built as part of a public–private partnership, who will maintain and operate PR-22 for the next 40 years.

Services

Logo signs
In 2021, Metropistas began installing logo signs at exits advertising available food, gas, lodging, camping, and attractions available at exits via a contract with SunColors. As of January 2022 such signs have been installed at Exit 13 in Bayamón, and Exit 48 in Manatí.

Tolls
PR-22 is maintained by a system of tolls managed by the Puerto Rico Department of Transportation and Public Works. All of its toll plazas have express lanes. After June 17, 2017, the seven tolls plaza of the PR-22 will become bidirectional.

Originally, PR-22 had only five toll plazas (Fort Buchanan, Toa Baja, Vega Alta, Factor ramp, and Hatillo); the Manatí and Arecibo toll plazas were added in the early 1990s.

The future segment from Hatillo to Aguadilla is expected to have four additional toll plazas; however, it remains to be seen whether they will be one way or two way.

As of 2014–2015, plans are underway to implement Open road tolling (ORT) and currently on many stretches of PR-22; Cash is no longer accepted to pay tolls with the exception of replenishing the toll tag.

On June 17, 2017 the new two-way collection rates came into effect by AutoExpreso in PR-22 and PR-5.

Exit list

See also

 Interstate Highways in Puerto Rico
 List of highways numbered 22

References

External links

 

022
22
Public–private partnerships in Puerto Rico
22
Tolled sections of Interstate Highways